The PSLV-C43 was the 45th mission of the Indian Polar Satellite Launch Vehicle (PSLV) program. It carried and deployed a total of 31 satellites, including the primary payload HySIS in sun-synchronous orbits. It was launched on 29 November 2018 by the Indian Space Research Organisation (ISRO) from the first launch pad of the Satish Dhawan Space Centre at Sriharikota, Andhra Pradesh.

PSLV-C43 launch 
The PSLV-C43 was launched from the first launch pad of the Satish Dhawan Space Centre in Sriharikota at 9:57 A.M. IST on 29 November 2018, following a 28-hour countdown that began at 5:58 A.M. IST on 28 November 2018.

References

External links

 PSLV-C43 / HysIS Mission - ISRO

Polar Satellite Launch Vehicle
Spacecraft launched by India in 2018
November 2018 events in India
Rocket launches in 2018